Buffalo Hump is a summit in the U.S. state of Idaho.

Buffalo Hump was so named from the fact its outline resembled a buffalo's hump; the English name perhaps is a translation of the Native American name.

References

Mountains of Idaho County, Idaho
Mountains of Idaho